The Nueces Massacre, also known as the Massacre on the Nueces, was a violent confrontation between Confederate soldiers and German Texans on August 10, 1862, in Kinney County, Texas U.S. Many first-generation immigrants from Germany settled in Central Texas in a region known as the Hill Country. They tended to support the United States and were opposed to the institution of slavery. Because of these sentiments, the Confederate States of America imposed martial law on Central Texas. A group of Germans, fleeing from the Hill Country to Mexico and onward to U.S.-controlled New Orleans, was confronted by a company of Confederate soldiers on the banks of the Nueces River. The ensuing German defeat represented an end to overt German resistance to Confederate governance in Texas, but it also fueled outrage among the German-Texan population. Disputes over the confrontation and the efficacy of Confederate actions after the battle, according to historian Stanley McGowen, continue to plague the Hill Country into the 21st century.

Background

Germans immigrated to Texas as early as 1836. By 1860, the German population in Texas, predominantly first-generation immigrants, reached an approximate level of 20,000 across the entire state. They settled heavily in an area known as the Hill Country. The exact dimensions of Hill Country are not concrete.  Germans settled so heavily in this area that the counties of Gillespie, Kerr, Kendall, Medina, and Bexar comprised a "German Belt".

During the antebellum period, Germans displayed a complex set of opinions on slavery and secession. Several Germans enslaved people, and some eventually supported Texas's secession from the United States. Most Germans, however were apathetic to slavery. A vocal minority of Germans was actively antagonistic to the institution of slavery. These antagonistic Germans included liberal and republican-minded Germans known as Achtundvierziger or Forty-Eighters. Many Forty-Eighters remained loyal to the United States, and several opposed slavery. Most secessionist Anglo-Texans found this to be an affront to their insurrection against the United States. German opposition to slavery led to animosity between the two groups throughout the 1850s. Texas' secession from the United States in March 1861 and the start of the American Civil War on April 12, 1861, magnified these disputes.

Upon the commencement of the war, Germans projected an outward appearance of passivity toward the conflict.  Nevertheless, Confederate officials saw the German population as an internal threat. The most adamant supporters of the United States were Tejanos and the German Texans, both from Central Texas and the counties of the Texas Hill Country. They had some evidence for that suspicion. During the statewide vote on secession, German-heavy counties represented many of those, along with the abolitionist northeast part of the state, to garner a majority vote against secession. Several reports at the beginning of 1862 even alleged that German communities celebrated U.S. Army victories. The state government also feared German-run local militias.

The Union Loyal League, organized by several Forty-Eighters, was one such militia.  The actual purpose of the league is still a debated issue. Historians Robert Shook and Stanley McGowen acknowledge, as German Texans maintained at the time, that the group's expressed purpose was to defend the Hill Country from Indians and outlaws.  Confederates, they confirm, considered the Union Loyal League the enforcement arm of German-Unionist sentiment.  Confederate officers even implicated the organization in strategies to free U.S. Army soldiers from Camp Verde.

With a need for more soldiers, the Confederacy established a draft. The Germans did not want to fight against the United States and objected to being drafted. The buildup to this event began in the spring of 1862 with the Confederacy's initiation of conscription of Texans, to which many German Texans voiced their objection. The Confederate Conscription Act of 1862 turned general German objection into open opposition. Because of this opposition, General Hamilton Bee dispatched Captain James Duff to Gillespie County.  In late May 1862, Captain Duff imposed martial law.  While in Gillespie County, Captain Duff arrested and executed two Germans.  The harsh conduct convinced several Germans to leave Texas. Frederick "Fritz" Tegener and his Union Loyal League associates planned a departure. They aimed to enter Mexico and make their way to U.S.-controlled New Orleans.

Flight and battle

Between August 1, and August 3, 1862, sixty-one German Texans, led by Fritz Tegener, departed from Turtle Creek and headed southwest for the Mexican border.  Informed of their intentions, Captain Duff dispatched Lieutenant Colin McRae with approximately 96 men in pursuit on August 3, 1862.  After six days, Lieutenant McRae and his men spied the German Texans in a small prairie along the Nueces River on August 9.  Lieutenant McRae then formulated an attack plan to commence later in the evening. He divided his force into two companies to surround the camp. At approximately 1:00 a.m. on August 10, 1862, the Confederates closed into the camp.  At first, however, even surprise and planning did not favor the Confederates. Two Germans wandering from the camp encountered the force.  The Confederates fired on these two Germans, which alerted the camp to the assault. Thus alerted, the Germans beat back the first Confederate charge.  Several Germans were disheartened by the Confederate presence and fled the field. Numbers vary, but Stanley McGowen estimates that twenty-three to twenty-eight Germans fled throughout the early morning hours.  This reduced the German contingent by over a third. A second charge closer to dawn routed the Germans and led to the flight (at least five Germans fled near the end of the battle, including Tegener), serious incapacitation, or death of all German combatants.

Casualties and aftermath

Out of the 96-man force, the Confederate losses counted two soldiers dead and eighteen wounded, including Lieutenant McRae. Reports on the casualties of the vanquished Germans were sparse and inconclusive. In 1962, historian Robert Shook tallied the German casualties at thirty killed and twenty wounded. A more recent conclusion in 2003, made by historian Randolph Campbell, is that 19 Germans died outright in the assaults on the camp. That was not the final tally for the German Texans' losses. Following the battle, Confederate soldiers killed nine badly-wounded Germans outright; cavalrymen pursued nine more to the Rio Grande, where they likewise killed the fleeing Germans. The complete German casualty report then comes to approximately thirty-seven killed and unknown totals for wounded among those who fled and survived.

Several Germans did survive the engagement and ensuing search. These combatants hid in Texas, fled to Mexico and California, or eventually joined U.S. forces in New Orleans as members of the 1st Texas Cavalry Regiment. More critical, however, was how the incident affected the German community in Texas for the rest of the war. Though Confederate actions met with some ire and loud objections from other German Texans, the incident marked the general end to overt German Unionist resistance in Texas for the remainder of the war.

Legacy

After the cessation of hostilities in 1865, Germans emerged as some of the most exuberant supporters of the United States' victory. The German-language Treue der Union Monument (loyalty to the Union), in Comfort, Texas, was dedicated on August 10, 1866, to commemorate those who died at the 1862 Nueces massacre. Except for those drowned in the Rio Grande, the remains of the deceased are buried at the monument's site.  It was the only Unionist monument dedicated by locals in the territory formerly controlled by the Confederacy.

Battle or massacre?
One title for the incident, the "Battle of Nueces" or the "Nueces Massacre", has been a contested issue since the engagement. Recently, historian Stanley McGowen has addressed both sides of the debate. He recognizes that the Germans were well-armed, judging by their ability to repulse a superior force. The initial engagement, he affirms, can be called the Battle of the Nueces. But the execution of Germans following the battle, he states, lends credence to the title Nueces Massacre. No name has garnered definitive support, and McGowen admits the debate on Confederate and German actions continues among descendants on both sides of the incident.

See also
List of massacres in the United States

Notes

Bibliography

Further reading
 Downing, David C. A South Divided: Portraits of Dissent in the Confederacy. Nashville: Cumberland House, 2007. 
"Massacre on the Nueces" (11 August 1862), by Richard Parker and Emily Boyd, The New York Times (2012), New York: The New York Times Company.

External links
Massacre on the Nueces River; story of a Civil War tragedy. Hosted by the Portal to Texas History
List of names inscribed on the Treue der Union monument
 

War crimes in the United States
Confederate war crimes
Massacres of the American Civil War
Southern Unionists in the American Civil War
German-American culture in Texas
History of Texas
Kinney County, Texas
1862 in Texas
1862 in the American Civil War
Military operations of the American Civil War in Texas
August 1862 events